Florence Charterhouse (Certosa di Firenze or Certosa del Galluzzo) is a charterhouse, or Carthusian monastery, located in the Florence suburb of Galluzzo, in central Italy. The building is a walled complex located on Monte Acuto, at the point of confluence of the Ema and Greve rivers.

The charterhouse was founded in 1341 by the Florentine noble Niccolò Acciaioli, Grand Seneschal of the Kingdom of Naples, but continued to expand over the centuries as the recipient of numerous donations. 

In 1958 the monastery was taken over by Cistercian monks.

The chapter house now holds five fresco lunettes by Pontormo from the cloister, damaged by exposure to the elements.

The charterhouse inspired Le Corbusier for his urban projects.

The monastery houses the Società Internazionale per lo Studio del Medioevo Latino, an Italian non-profit cultural institute.

Passion of Christ (Pontormo)

References

External links

Carthusian monasteries in Italy
Monasteries in Tuscany
1341 establishments in Europe
14th-century establishments in the Republic of Florence
Charterhouse
Christian monasteries established in the 14th century